Fred A. Thomas (May 26, 1865 – June 12, 1958) was a politician in the state of Montana.

Biography
Thomas was born on May 26, 1865 in Potosi, Wisconsin and died on June 12, 1958 in Stevensville, Montana. His grandson, also named Fred, served in the Montana State Senate.

Career
Thomas served as a member of the Montana House of Representatives from 1947 to 1949. He was a Republican. Thomas publicly opposed Mike Mansfield's candidacy for the U.S. Senate in 1952, accusing Mansfield of communist sympathies.

References

1865 births
1958 deaths
People from Potosi, Wisconsin
People from Stevensville, Montana
Members of the Montana House of Representatives